Alice Hanson Cook (November 28, 1903 – February 7, 1998) was an activist and professor of labor history at Cornell University in the United States. At Cornell, the Alice Cook House residential college was named in her honor.

Her varied life experiences included social worker, YWCA secretary, labor educator, post World War II advisor in Germany on reconstituting German labor unions, professor, university ombudsman, world acclaimed researcher, and to the very end, an activist. Cook was appointed Cornell University's first ombudsman and worked to establish the credibility and acceptance of that office.

Autobiography

A Lifetime of Labor: the autobiography of Alice H. Cook / foreword by Arlene Kaplan Daniels.
1st ed.
New York: Feminist Press at the City University of New York, 1998.

References

External links
  Guide to the Alice Cook Papers at the Kheel Center for Labor-Management Documentation and Archives, Cornell University Library
 New York Times obituary

Cornell University faculty
1903 births
1998 deaths
Northwestern University alumni
Labor historians